PPTV is a Chinese video streaming website. Its predecessor, PPLive, was peer-to-peer streaming video freeware created at the Huazhong University of Science and Technology in Wuhan, Hubei Province. The group of companies that runs the website was headed by Cayman Islands-incorporated offshore company PPLive Corporation. However, the actual operations were mainly carried out by Shanghai SynaCast Media Tech Co., Ltd..

History 
A 68.08% stake of the parent company of PPTV, PPLive Corporation, was acquired by  Chinese blue chip listed company Suning Commerce Group (now known as Suning.com) in 2013–14.

TV rights 

PPTV owns the following football broadcasting rights in China:
International Champions Cup
UEFA
UEFA National Team Home Friendlies (2018–2022)
UEFA Champions League (2018–2022)
UEFA Europa League (2018–2022)
UEFA Super Cup (2018–2021)
UEFA Youth League (2018–2021)
UEFA Women's Champions League (2018–2021)
Copa América (2020)
Chinese Super League (2018-2025) (terminated before 2021 season commenced)
K League
J League
DFL (2018-2023) (terminated after 2020–21 season)
Bundesliga
DFL-Supercup
DFB-Pokal
La Liga (2015–2020) (terminated after 2018–19 season)
Copa del Rey
Supercopa de España
Premier League (2019–2022) (terminated early in August 2020)
FA Cup (2018–2024) (terminated in February 2021)
FA Community Shield (2018–2020)
Serie A (2018-2021) (terminated in February 2021)
Ligue 1 (2018-2021)
Brasileirão (2021)
Primera Division de Argentina

https://www.cbf.com.br/a-cbf/informes/index/brasileirao-assai-sera-transmitido-na-china-pela-pp-sports-lider-em-d

References

External links 
  

Peercasting
Peer-to-peer software
Chinese entertainment websites
Video hosting